In mineralogy, an inclusion is any material that is trapped inside a mineral during its formation. In gemology, an inclusion is a characteristic enclosed within a gemstone, or reaching its surface from the interior.

According to Hutton's law of inclusions, fragments included in a host rock are older than the host rock itself.

Mineralogy
Inclusions are usually other minerals or rocks, but may also be water, gas or petroleum. Liquid or vapor inclusions are known as fluid inclusions. In the case of amber it is possible to find insects and plants as inclusions.

The analysis of atmospheric gas bubbles as inclusions in ice cores is an important tool in the study of climate change.

A xenolith is a pre-existing rock which has been picked up by a lava flow. Melt inclusions form when bits of melt become trapped inside crystals as they form in the melt.

Gemology

Inclusions are one of the most important factors when it comes to gem valuation. In many gemstones, such as diamonds, inclusions affect the clarity of the gem, diminishing the value. In some gems, however, such as star sapphires, the inclusion actually increases the value of the gem.

Many colored gemstones are expected to have inclusions, and the inclusions do not greatly affect the stone's value. Colored gemstones are categorized into three types as follows:

Type I colored gems include gems with very little or no inclusions. They include aquamarines, topaz and zircon.
Type II colored gems include those that often have a few inclusions. They include sapphire, ruby, garnet and spinel.
Type III colored gems include those that almost always have inclusions. Gems in this category include emerald and tourmaline.

Metallurgy

The term "inclusion" is also used in the context of metallurgy and metals processing. During the melt stage of processing particles such as oxides can enter or form in the liquid metal which are subsequently trapped when the melt solidifies. The term is usually used negatively such as when the particle could act as a fatigue crack nucleator or as an area of high stress intensity.

See also
Diamond inclusions

References

Mineralogy
Petrology
Gemology
Metallurgy